Adéodat Boissard (1870–1938) was a French politician. He served as a member of the Chamber of Deputies from 1919 to 1924, representing Côte-d'Or.

References

1870 births
1938 deaths
People from Aix-en-Provence
Politicians from Provence-Alpes-Côte d'Azur
Republican Federation politicians
Members of the 12th Chamber of Deputies of the French Third Republic